Ma Zhi (born 10 May 1965) is a Chinese fencer. He competed in the individual épée event at the 1988 Summer Olympics.

References

1965 births
Living people
Chinese male épée fencers
Olympic fencers of China
Fencers at the 1988 Summer Olympics
Asian Games medalists in fencing
Fencers at the 1986 Asian Games
Fencers at the 1990 Asian Games
Asian Games silver medalists for China
Medalists at the 1986 Asian Games
Medalists at the 1990 Asian Games
20th-century Chinese people